Manouane (including Manawan) may also refer to:

Toponymes 
Canada (in Quebec)